The 2019 Qatar Open (also known as 2019 Qatar ExxonMobil Open for sponsorship reasons) was a men's tennis tournament played on outdoor hard courts. It was the 27th edition of the Qatar Open, and part of the ATP Tour 250 series of the 2019 ATP Tour. It took place at the Khalifa International Tennis and Squash Complex in Doha, Qatar, from 31 December to 5 January.

Singles main-draw entrants

Seeds 

 1 Rankings are as of 24 December 2018.

Other entrants 
The following players received wildcards into the singles main draw:
  Tomáš Berdych
  Cem İlkel
  Mubarak Shannan Zayid

The following players received entry from the qualifying draw:
  Ričardas Berankis
  Guillermo García López
  Maximilian Marterer
  Sergiy Stakhovsky

The following player received entry by a lucky loser:
  Paolo Lorenzi

Withdrawals 
  Richard Gasquet → replaced by  Stan Wawrinka
  Mikhail Kukushkin → replaced by  Andrey Rublev
  Feliciano López → replaced by  Paolo Lorenzi

Doubles main-draw entrants

Seeds 

 1 Rankings are as of 24 December 2018.

Other entrants 
The following pairs received wildcards into the doubles main draw:
  Marko Djokovic /  Novak Djokovic 
  Cem İlkel /  Mubarak Shannan Zayid

Champions

Singles 

  Roberto Bautista Agut def.  Tomáš Berdych, 6–4, 3–6, 6–3

Doubles 

  David Goffin /  Pierre-Hugues Herbert def.  Robin Haase /  Matwé Middelkoop, 5–7, 6–4, [10–4]

References

External links 
 

 
2019 ATP Tour
2019
January 2019 sports events in Asia